Glendale was a Long Island Rail Road station along the Lower Montauk Branch, located in Glendale, Queens at Edsall Avenue and 73rd Street, near Central Avenue, at the All Faiths Monuments factory for the All Faiths Cemetery. This station had two "platforms" which were just strips of pavement besides the tracks signed as the station, and two tracks.

In recent years, proposals to bring back passenger service along the Lower Montauk Branch have been suggested.

History
The station opened around June 1869 (although some sources claim it was built in 1868) and contained a small station house along the eastbound tracks. Nearby freight service included such companies as American Grass Twine Works, and Prairie Grass Furniture Company. Trains from the Rockaway Beach Branch also served the station prior to that line's connection with the LIRR Main Line. In January 1927, due to decreasing ridership, the LIRR razed the station, and on September 27, 1927, the name was moved to a new station at Metropolitan Avenue on the Rockaway Beach Branch. The name had lasted only for slightly more than a month until it was changed to Parkside Station on October 23, 1927, and Glendale was returned to the Montauk Branch as a wooden sheltered shed along the westbound tracks by 1928. The wooden shed was replaced by corrugated iron during World War II.

This station closed on March 16, 1998 along with the other remaining stations on the Lower Montauk branch, due to low ridership and inability to accommodate the C3 bi-level coaches, which can stop only at stations with high level platforms. This station had only two riders daily at the time of its closure.

References

External links
Glendale SSRRLI Station; 1868-1998 (Arrt's Arrchives)

Former Long Island Rail Road stations in New York City
Railway stations in Queens, New York

Railway stations in the United States opened in 1868
Glendale, Queens